John 'Jack' Gordon Clark (1926–1999) was a Harvard psychiatrist known for his research on the alleged damaging effects of cults.

He was the target of harassment from the Church of Scientology after he testified against it to the Vermont legislature in 1976.

The Psychiatric Times, when naming him 1991 psychiatrist of the year, described him as "a quiet, courageous man of conviction, who was fighting an all-too-lonely and unappreciated battle against well-financed, ruthless organizations."

Works 
 Clark, John G. Cults. Journal of the American Medical Association. 242, 279–281. 1979
 Clark, John G.: On the further study of destructive cultism. In Halperin (ed.), 363–368

References

1926 births
1999 deaths
Harvard Medical School alumni
Harvard Medical School faculty
American psychiatrists
Critics of Scientology
Clark, John G.
Brainwashing theory proponents